Lee Yeong-sin (born May 28, 1997), better known by his stage name Punchnello, is a South Korean rapper. He released his first extended play, Ordinary, in 2019. Later that year, he won the rap competition show Show Me the Money 8.

Discography

Studio albums

Extended plays

Singles

Filmography

Television

References

External links 
 

1997 births
Living people
South Korean male rappers
Show Me the Money (South Korean TV series) contestants